Komisarivka may refer to the following places in Ukraine:

 Komisarivka, Dnipropetrovsk Oblast
 Komisarivka, Alchevsk Raion, Luhansk Oblast
 Komisarivka, Krasnodon Raion, Luhansk Oblast
 Komisarivka, Mykolaiv Oblast